The Cannon Point Walkway is a hiking trail in the Akatarawa Forest on the western side of the Hutt Valley in the North Island of New Zealand. The portion of the track through the Akatarawa Forest Park is maintained by the Greater Wellington Regional Council.

The name of the hill and the walkway comes from the reports of a large tree that fell near the top  of the hill. The fallen tree was said to look like a cannon when viewed from below. The area was part of Valley View Station, and the steep zig-zag track to the summit was originally cut by the farm owners for access on foot and horseback. 

The road ends are at Bridge Road, Birchville and Tulsa Reserve in Tōtara Park. The route from Bridge Road follows the path of a former water supply pipeline upstream along Clarke's Creek to the historic Birchville Dam. From the dam there is a steep ascent to the ridgeline and then along to the Cannon Point trig at  elevation. From the trig there are panoramic views of the Hutt Valley. The loop is completed by a walk along the banks of the Hutt River between the two road ends.

A  zig-zag portion of the track from Tulsa Park up to the Cannon Point trig crosses private land, and was closed by the landowner in December 2017 after a dispute between the landowner and the Upper Hutt City Council. Access was restored in August 2018.

A new bridge at the Birchville end of the track was opened in October 2022.

References

Upper Hutt
Hiking and tramping tracks in New Zealand
Regional parks of New Zealand